Computer science is one of several academic events sanctioned by the University Interscholastic League (UIL).

Computer science is designed to test students' programming abilities. It is not the same as the computer applications contest, which tests students' abilities to use word processing, spreadsheet, and database applications software, including integration of applications.

Computer science began during the 1990-91 scholastic year as strictly a team event. It was not scored as an individual event until the 1996-97 school year.

Eligibility 
Students in Grade 9 through Grade 12 are eligible to enter this event.

Each school may send up to four students. However, in districts with eight or more schools the number of students per school may be limited to three. In order for the school to compete in the team competition the school must send three students.

Rules and Scoring 
The contest consists of two parts, a written test and a programming exercise. 

On the written test, 45 minutes are allotted. No time warnings are given, but at the end of the 45 minutes the student may finish completing an answer. Six points are given for each correct answer; two points are deducted for each incorrect answer. Skipped or unanswered questions are not scored.

On the programming test, two hours are allotted. The solution is graded as correct or incorrect with points assigned for each problem. However, incorrect solutions may be reworked by the team. Any commercially available computer may be used in the competition. The programming language to be used is limited to Java and the compiler used for the contest will be the  Oracle Java Development Kit; specific acceptable versions are determined by the UIL prior to each school year.

Determining the Winner 
The top three individuals and the top team will advance to the next round. In addition, within each region, the highest-scoring second place team from all district competitions advances as the "wild card" to regional competition, and within the state, the highest-scoring second place team from all regional competitions advances as the wild card to the state competition. Members of advancing teams who did not place individually remain eligible to compete for individual awards at higher levels.

For individual competition (overall and for each subsection), the tiebreaker is percent accuracy (number of problems answered correctly divided by number of problems attempted, defined as any question with a mark or erasure in the answer blank). In the event a tie remains, all remaining individuals will advance.

For the team competition the first tiebreaker is the programming score, then the written exam score (using the total score tiebreaker system used at the district level). If a tie still exists, all remaining tied teams will advance or place.

For district meet academic championship and district meet sweepstakes awards, points are awarded to the school as follows:
Individual places: 1st--15, 2nd--12, 3rd--10, 4th--8, 5th--6, and 6th--4.
Team places (district): 1st--10 and 2nd--5.
Team places (regional and state): 1st--20, 2nd--16, and 3rd--12.
The maximum number of points a school may earn in Computer Science is 37 at the district level and 42 at the regional and state levels.

List of prior winners

Individual 
NOTE: For privacy reasons, only the winning school is shown. Computer Science was strictly a team event until the 1996-97 school year.

Team 
NOTE: The 1990-91 contest was limited to Class AAAA and Class AAAAA only; other classifications were not added until the 1991-92 year. The AAAAAA classification was not added until the 2014-2015 year.

References 

Official UIL Rules for Computer Science--High School NOTE: This file contains rules for other competitions; Section 928 covers Computer Science.
Study materials from Mike Scott, previous Comp Sci UIL director NOTE: This link contains study materials from Mike Scott, the previous UIL CS director.
2010-2011 Topic List for CS UIL NOTE: This link contains study materials from Mike Scott, the previous UIL CS director.
University Interscholastic League
|}